Drašiči is a village in the Municipality of Metlika in the White Carniola area of southeastern Slovenia, next to the border with Croatia. The entire area is part of the traditional region of Lower Carniola and is now included in the Southeast Slovenia Statistical Region.

The local church is dedicated to Saint Peter and belongs to the Parish of Metlika. It is a late Baroque church built in 1773.

In 1934, an Eneolithic settlement was excavated in the Stari Grad area of the settlement.

References

External links

Drašiči on Geopedia

Populated places in the Municipality of Metlika